James Lemke (born 25 January 1988) is a former Australian professional tennis player. He competed mainly on the ATP Challenger Tour and ITF Futures, both in singles and doubles. He reached his highest ATP singles ranking, No. 224 on 6 June 2011, and his highest ATP doubles ranking, No. 293, on 10 October 2011.

ATP Challenger and ITF Futures finals

Singles: 13 (6–7)

Doubles: 11 (6–5)

References

External links
 
 
 

1988 births
Living people
Australian male tennis players
Tennis players from Melbourne
21st-century Australian people